The following list of ambassadors of Belgium to the United States excludes interim chargés d'affaires.

Envoys extraordinary and ministers plenipotentiary
1848: Colonel Beaulieu.
1864: Eduard Blondeel
1882-1885: Théodore de Bounder de Melsbrœck
1897–1899: Count G. de Lichtervelde
1889–1901: Alfred Le Ghait
1901–1909: Baron Moncheur
1909–1911: Count 
1911–1917: E. Havenith
1917–1919: Emile de Cartier de Marchienne,

Ambassadors extraordinary and plenipotentiary
Baron de Cartier de Marchienne, 1920–1927
Prince Albert de Ligne, 1927–1931
Paul May (diplomat), 1931–1934
Count Robert van der Straten Ponthoz, 1935–1945
Baron , 1945–1959
Louis Scheyven, 1959–1969
Walter Loridan, 1969–1974
Willy Van Cauwenberg, 1974–1979
Raoul Schoumaker, 1979–1985
Herman Dehennin, 1986–1991
Juan Gassiers, 1991–1994
André Adam, 1994–1998
Alexis Reyn, 1998–2002
Frans van Daele, 2002–2006
Dominique Struye de Swielande, 2007–2009
Jan Matthysen, 2009–2014
Johan Verbeke, 2014–2016
Dirk Wouters, 2016–2020
Jean-Arthur Régibeau, 2020–present

References

List
United States
Bel